Don Baltasar de Marradas et Vique or Maradas (28 November 1560, Valencia – 12 August 1638, Prague) was a Spanish nobleman, imperial field marshal during the Thirty Years' War and governor of Bohemia.

Life 
Balthazar was the son of Gaspar de Marradas Soler (d.1569) Baron of Sallent and the Viceroy of Mallorca (1548-1557), and Anna vich Manrique. Both came from large noble families who had performed important services to the king as admirals, ambassadors, generals, and prelates. Anne was the sister of Luis the Viceroy of Mallorca (1573-1584), and of Juan vich Manrique the Bishop of Mallorca and later Archbishop of Tarragona. Baltasar's uncle was Guillen de San Clemente y de Centelles (1530-1608), aka Guillem de Santcliment i de Centelled, a Spanish politician, soldier, diplomat, a knight of Santiago, and Commander of Moratalla. He started young in the art of weapons. After becoming an hospitable knight he left for Malta, where he "gained the opinion of a courageous Soldier and a great knight". As such , he fought in Piedmont, Milan, and Flanders. 

Marradas, a knight of Malta, arrived at the imperial court of Rudolf II in 1599, in the midst of the Long Turkish War. In 1617 during the Uskok War he fought against the Republic of Venice in defense of Gradisca. In the war against the Winter King Frederick V in 1619, he commanded a Spanish cavalry regiment.

Despite the fact that he could show no great military successes, he was raised in 1621 to the rank of an imperial count and provided with plenty of land. In 1626 he became a field marshal and in 1627 was appointed lieutenant general. Marradas was involved in the negotiations for the dismissal of Wallenstein in 1630 in Regensburg. At Prague in 1631 he retreated without a fight to the advancing troops from Saxony, under Hans Georg von Arnim-Boitzenburg. After further failures in Silesia, he was deposed in 1632 at the instigation of Wallenstein. Marradas 1634 was one of the masterminds behind the murder of Wallenstein.

In 1634 Baltasar Marradas was appointed commissioner of the army of Bohemia with an appanage of 800 florins monthly in 30 parts.

He died in 1638 as a privy councilor and governor of Bohemia.

References

1560 births
1638 deaths
Counts of Spain
People from Valencia
Spanish people of the Thirty Years' War
Field marshals of the Holy Roman Empire